Aidan Key (born January 22, 1964) is an educator, author, speaker, and community organizer. As a transgender man active in LGBT rights, Key's ground-breaking work includes developing policies and procedures for the equality of transgender children in schools grades K-12, comprising challenging topics such as gender neutral bathrooms, transgender students' athletic participation (including locker rooms), privacy and disclosure of transgender status, and name and gender changes.

Career 
Key's expertise on gender nonconformity in children has informed gender-inclusive policy work within the Washington State Office of Superintendent of Public Instruction, the Washington Interscholastic Activities Association, and Seattle Public Schools, as well as collaborated in the creation of the WIAA sports toolkit.
 
Key authored the Trans Bodies, Trans Selves manual addressing the support and understanding of transgender children .  He co-authored the article Gender Cognition in Transgender Children, and has contributed to various outlets including The Huffington Post, and Welcoming Schools.

Key founded the international Gender Odyssey conference in 2001, which has since grown to include the Gender Odyssey Family conference for transgender and gender-nonconforming children and their families, as well as the Gender Odyssey Professional conference, providing instruction to medical, mental health, and education professionals.  Keynote speakers have included notables such as Chaz Bono; Cheryl Kilodavis, author of My Princess Boy; Janet Mock; and author, performer and gender activist Kate Bornstein. Strategic Director of Trans Families.

Key co-chairs the Advisory Board of the Seattle Children's Gender Clinic, and serves on the advisory committee of TRANSform Washington, a public education campaign advancing the dignity, diversity and humanity of transgender and gender-diverse people. His past collaborations include working with Three Dollar Bill Cinema to launch the Seattle Translations Film Festival and co-founding the Bay Area nonprofit Gender Spectrum.

Media

His perspective on trans issues has often been featured in the national media, including multiple reports on CNN, The Oprah Winfrey Show, Reuters, NPR’s Diane Rehm Show and Fresh Air with Terry Gross, Al Jazeera America, The Huffington Post, Inside Edition, Nightline, The New York Times, The Seattle Times, Parent Map, Vice, and Larry King Live.  His appearance on Larry King Live inspired a Saturday Night Live skit spoofing the obvious confusion of the host on issues related to transgender identities. 

Lead Cast Member and Associate Producer for the documentary The Most Dangerous Year.

Speaking

Key is a regular speaker at universities and conferences including the DSHS Children’s Justice Conference 2013, Adolescent Health Medicine Conference 2010, The Power of One: LGBT Student Leadership, and the Gender Odyssey Conference 2014. He has been a featured speaker at churches, universities, and special events.

Personal

Aidan Key is an identical twin. His twin sister, Brenda Bowers, has joined him for numerous media appearances, including The Oprah Winfrey Show and the ITV documentary The Secret Life of Twins, and articles in numerous international publications.  Key and Bowers were the impetus for the launch of research by Milton Diamond, PhD, Transsexuality Among Twins, studying the concordance of transgender gender identity in identical twins.

Key is married, a father of one, and lives in Alaska.

Awards

2018 Huffington Post's "Top 20 LGBTQ Change Makers" 
 2013 Trans 100: Inaugural Member of Trans 100
 Greater Seattle Business Association B&H Awards 2017 - Community Leader of the Year
 Seattle Magazine, "Movers & Shakers: Seattle's Most Influential People of the Year 2019", TransFamilies Executive Director, Aidan Key, November 2019
2009 Esteem Awards - "Chicago Black Pride"

References

External links

Gender-nonconforming & Transgender Children on 3/13/2015
Transgender and gender diverse identities in children on 3/13/2015

American educators
1964 births
Transgender men
American male writers
Transgender writers
Living people
21st-century LGBT people